Simrithi Haresh Bathija (born 9 April 1999) is an Indian model and beauty pageant titleholder. As Glamanand Miss India International 2019, she represented India at the 59th edition of the Miss International pageant in Tokyo, Japan.

Education and career
Simrithi was born on 9 April 1999 in a Sindhi family and was educated at Sacred Heart School in Thane, Maharashtra.
She has a graduation degree in mass media from the Jai Hind College, Mumbai. She is a national level fencing athlete and has played roll ball in state level. She is also a trained dancer, and has worked as a radio jockey for 4 years.

Simrithi was featured in an episode of MTV channel's reality show 'Elevator Pitch'. She appeared in a television commercial for Cinépolis (India). She has worked as a fashion model for various clothing brands.

Pageantry
In 2017, Simrithi was selected as a finalist in the Indian Model Look contest. 
At the age of 19, she won a regional pageant 'Miss Mumbai 2018'. The following year,  she auditioned for the Glamanand Supermodel India contest and was shortlisted as a finalist. 19 finalists from across India competed in the contest. On 29 September 2019, the grand finale of the contest was held in Jai Bagh Palace, Jaipur and Simrithi Bathija was crowned as Miss India International 2019 by the outgoing titleholder Tanishqa Bhosale, earning the right to represent India at the Miss International 2019 pageant which was held in Tokyo, Japan.

Television

References

Awards and achievements

External links

1999 births
Living people
Sindhi people
Miss International 2019 delegates
Indian female fencers
Indian women radio presenters
Indian beauty pageant winners
Female models from Mumbai
Female models from Maharashtra